Hermanus Hendrikus "Henk" Steeman (15 January 1894 in Rotterdam – 16 February 1979 in the Hague) was a football (soccer) player from the Netherlands, who represented his home country at the 1920 Summer Olympics. There he won the bronze medal with the Netherlands national football team. A player of Sparta Rotterdam, Steeman obtained a total number of 13 caps for Holland, from 1919 to 1925.

References

External links

  Dutch Olympic Committee

1894 births
1979 deaths
Dutch footballers
Footballers at the 1920 Summer Olympics
Olympic footballers of the Netherlands
Olympic bronze medalists for the Netherlands
Sparta Rotterdam players
Footballers from Rotterdam
Netherlands international footballers
Olympic medalists in football
Medalists at the 1920 Summer Olympics
Association football midfielders
Quick 1888 players